Stephen Hope Fry (23 May 1900 – 18 May 1979) was an English first-class cricketer. A right-handed batsman who played primarily as a wicketkeeper, he was the son of  C. B. Fry. He made his first-class debut for Hampshire in 1922 against local rivals Sussex at the County Ground, Southampton. Fry played for Hampshire three times in 1922, with his third and final match coming against Surrey at The Oval.

Seven years later in 1929 Fry made his return to Hampshire, marking it with a match against Derbyshire. Fry would go on to play 26 matches spread over three County Championship seasons up to 1931.

Fry could not emulate the attacking philosophies of his father in first-class cricket. In his career Fry scored 508 runs at an average of 10.58, with a single half century which yielded his highest first-class score of 78. As a wicketkeeper Fry took sixteen catches and made one stumping. His retirement from first-class cricket followed his final match of the 1931 season which came against Warwickshire. During that season Fry stood in for Lord Tennyson to captain Hampshire in a few County Championship matches, one of five captains that season.

Fry represented the Marylebone Cricket Club in three non first-class matches. He played a single match for the club against Wiltshire in 1922 and two further matches for the club in 1924 against an Indian Gymkhana side.

Fry died in Notting Hill, London on 18 May 1979.

Family
Fry was the son of famous Hampshire and England cricketer C.B. Fry. Fry himself had a son, Charles Fry who himself played first-class cricket for Oxford University between 1959 and 1961; Hampshire in 1960; Northamptonshire in 1962.

External links
Stephen Fry at Cricinfo
Stephen Fry at CricketArchive
Matches and detailed statistics for Stephen Fry

1901 births
1979 deaths
Cricketers from Portsmouth
English cricketers
Hampshire cricketers
Marylebone Cricket Club cricketers